The 64th annual Berlin International Film Festival was held from 6 to 16 February 2014. Wes Anderson's film The Grand Budapest Hotel opened the festival. British film director Ken Loach was presented with the Honorary Golden Bear. The Golden Bear was awarded to the Chinese film Black Coal, Thin Ice directed by Diao Yinan, which also served as closing film.

Competition

Jury
The following people were announced as being on the jury for the festival:

International jury
 James Schamus, film producer and screenwriter (United States) - Jury President 
 Barbara Broccoli, film producer (United States)
 Trine Dyrholm, actress (Denmark)
 Mitra Farahani, film director (Iran)
 Greta Gerwig, actress and film director (United States)
 Michel Gondry, film director, screenwriter, and producer (France)
 Tony Leung, actor (China)
 Christoph Waltz, actor (Austria)

Best First Feature Award Jury
 Nancy Buirski, director, screenwriter, producer and founder of the Full Frame Documentary Film Festival (United States)
 Valeria Golino, actress and director (Italy)
 Hernán Musaluppi, film producer (Argentina)

International Short Film Jury
 Edwin, director (Indonesia)
 Nuno Rodrigues, curator and producer (Portugal)
 Christine Tohmé, curator (Lebanon)

In competition
The following films were selected for the main competition for the Golden Bear and Silver Bear awards:
{| class="sortable wikitable" width="79%" cellpadding="5"
|-
!scope="col" width="30%"| English title
!scope="col" width="30%"| Original title
!scope="col" width="25%"| Director(s)
!scope="col" width="15%"| Production country
|-
| '71 * || 71 ||Yann Demange || United Kingdom
|-
| Life of Riley || Aimer, boire et chanter ||Alain Resnais || France
|-
| Aloft || Aloft ||Claudia Llosa || Spain, Canada, France
|-
| Beloved Sisters || Die geliebten Schwestern ||Dominik Graf || Germany
|-
| Stratos || Μικρό Ψάρι Mikro psari ||Yannis Economides || Greece, Germany, Cyprus
|-
| The Grand Budapest Hotel || The Grand Budapest Hotel ||Wes Anderson || United Kingdom, Germany
|-style="background:#FFDEAD;"
| Black Coal, Thin Ice || 白日焰火 Bai Ri Yan Huo ||Diao Yinan || China
|-
| Boyhood || Boyhood ||Richard Linklater || United States
|-
| The Little House || 小さいおうち Chiisai Ouchi ||Yoji Yamada || Japan
|-
| History of Fear * || Historia del Miedo ||Benjamín Naishtat || Argentina, Uruguay, Germany, France
|-
| Jack || Jack ||Edward Berger || Germany
|-
| In Order of Disappearance || Kraftidioten ||Hans Petter Moland || Norway
|-
| Stations of the Cross || Kreuzweg ||Dietrich Brüggemann || Germany
|-
| The Third Side of the River || La tercera orilla ||Celina Murga ||Argentina, Germany, Netherlands
|-
| Two Men in Town || La voie de l‘ennemi ||Rachid Bouchareb ||France, Algeria, United States, Belgium
|-
| Macondo * || Macondo ||Sudabeh Mortezai || Austria
|-
| Praia do Futuro || Praia do Futuro ||Karim Aïnouz || Brazil, Germany
|-
| Blind Massage || 推拿 Tui Na ||Lou Ye || China, France
|-
| No Man's Land || 無人區 Wu Ren Qu ||Ning Hao || China
|-
| Inbetween Worlds || Zwischen Welten ||Feo Aladag || Germany
|-
|}

Out of competition
The following films were selected to be screened out of competition:

Panorama
The following films were selected for the Panorama section:

Berlinale Special Galas
The following films were selected for the Berlinale Special Galas section:

Berlinale Classics
The following films were selected to be screened in the Berlinale Classics section:

Key
{| class="wikitable" width="550" colspan="2"
| align="center"| *
|Directorial debut feature; eligible for the Best First Feature Award
|-
| style="background:#FFDEAD;" align="center"| †
|Winner of the main award for best film in its section
|-
| colspan="2"| The opening and closing films were screened during the opening and closing ceremonies respectively.
|}

Awards
The following prizes were awarded:
 Golden Bear – Black Coal, Thin Ice by Diao Yinan
 Silver Bear Grand Jury Prize  – The Grand Budapest Hotel by Wes Anderson
 Alfred Bauer Prize (Silver Bear) – Life of Riley by Alain Resnais
 Silver Bear for Best Director – Richard Linklater for Boyhood Silver Bear for Best Actress – Haru Kuroki for The Little House Silver Bear for Best Actor – Liao Fan for Black Coal, Thin Ice Silver Bear for Best Script – Stations of the Cross by Dietrich Brüggemann
 Silver Bear for Outstanding Artistic Contribution for Cinematography – Blind Massage by Lou Ye
 Best First Feature Award – Güeros by Alonso Ruizpalacios
 Panoroma Audience Award
 1st Place: Difret by Zeresenay Berhane Mehari
 2nd Place: The Way He Looks by Daniel Ribeiro
 3rd Place: Brides by Tinatin Kajrishvili
 Teddy Award: The Way He Looks'' by Daniel Ribeiro

References

External links

64
2014 film festivals
2014 festivals in Europe
2014 in Berlin
Berl